Purpurschinia is a genus of moths of the family Noctuidae. It was raised for Schinia purpurascens, but it is unclear if it is widely accepted.

References
Natural History Museum Lepidoptera genus database

Heliothinae